Count Festenberg (German: Graf Festenberg) is a 1922 German silent film directed by Urban Gad and Frederic Zelnik and starring Charles Willy Kayser, Harald Paulsen and Heinrich Peer.

Cast
In alphabetical order
Charles Willy Kayser
Harald Paulsen
Heinrich Peer
Paul Rehkopf
Maria Widal
Frederic Zelnik

References

External links

Films of the Weimar Republic
Films directed by Urban Gad
Films directed by Frederic Zelnik
German silent feature films
German black-and-white films